Microdevario is a small genus of danionin cyprinids. It was recently described to include species previously in the genus Microrasbora.

Species
There are currently three recognized species in this genus:
 Microdevario gatesi Herre, 1939
 Microdevario kubotai (Kottelat & K. E. Witte, 1999)
 Microdevario nana (Kottelat & K. E. Witte, 1999)

References

 
Fish of Asia